Cura Carpignano is a comune (municipality) in the Province of Pavia in the Italian region Lombardy, located about 30 km south of Milan and about 9 km northeast of Pavia.

References

Cities and towns in Lombardy